L15 or L-15 may refer to:

Vehicles 
Aircraft
 Boeing L-15 Scout, an American liaison aircraft
 Daimler L15, a German light aircraft
 Hongdu L-15, a Chinese supersonic training and light attack aircraft

Ships
 , an amphibious assault ship of the Royal Navy
 , a destroyer of the Royal Navy
 , a sloop of the Royal Navy
 , a submarine of the Royal Navy
 , several ships of the Indian Navy

Other uses 
 60S ribosomal protein L15
 Lectionary 15, a 13th-century, Greek manuscript of the New Testament
 Lindeteves-Jacoberg Limited, a Singaporean investment holding company
 Mitochondrial ribosomal protein L15
 Nikon Coolpix L15, a digital camera